Roberto Canella Suárez (born 7 February 1988) is a Spanish professional footballer who plays as a left-back for CD Calahorra.

He spent most of his professional career with Sporting de Gijón since making his debut with the first team at the age of 18, going on to appear in 313 official matches. Of those, 129 were in La Liga (four goals).

Canella represented Spain at under-19, under-20 and under-21 levels.

Club career

Sporting Gijón
Canella was born in Laviana, Asturias. A product of Sporting de Gijón's cantera he first appeared with the main squad during 2006–07, and established himself as first choice the following season as they returned to La Liga after a ten-year hiatus.

Canella scored his first top-flight goal on 5 October 2008 in a 2–0 away win against RCD Mallorca, being a starter throughout the campaign. According to Cadena COPE, Real Madrid was likely to acquire his services for 2009–10. Eventually nothing came of it, and the player again occupied the left-back position for the vast majority of the season, with Sporting again retaining their league status.

In the following years, Canella continued battling for position with another club youth graduate, José Ángel, with both players appearing in roughly the same number of matches. In 2011–12, following the latter's departure to A.S. Roma, he became the starter for the Manuel Preciado-led side.

On 27 June 2014, Canella was loaned to Deportivo de La Coruña, recently returned to the top tier. On 22 June 2019, the 31-year-old left Sporting after spending 20 years at the club and playing more than 300 competitive games for them.

Later career
On 27 July 2019, free agent Canella signed a two-year deal with CD Lugo of Segunda División. Three years later, the 34-year-old joined Primera Federación team CD Calahorra.

International career
Internationally, Canella helped Spain to win the 2006 UEFA European Under-19 Championship, played at the 2007 FIFA U-20 World Cup still being under-19 and then moved to the under-21s.

Honours
Spain U19
UEFA European Under-19 Championship: 2006

References

External links

1988 births
Living people
People from Laviana
Spanish footballers
Footballers from Asturias
Association football defenders
La Liga players
Segunda División players
Tercera División players
Primera Federación players
Sporting de Gijón B players
Sporting de Gijón players
Deportivo de La Coruña players
CD Lugo players
CD Calahorra players
Spain youth international footballers
Spain under-21 international footballers